Konkov is a Russian masculine surname, its feminine counterpart is Konkova. It may refer to
Anatoliy Konkov (born 1949), Ukrainian football player
Olga Konkova (born 1969), Norwegian/Russians jazz musician
Roman Konkov (born 1993), Russian ice hockey player
Sergei Konkov (born 1982), Russian ice hockey winger 

Russian-language surnames